Michael O'Keeffe (born 9 August 1990) is a New Zealand football player who plays as a goalkeeper for Team Wellington and played for the New Zealand national under-23 football team. Since 2017, O’Keeffe has been a TV reporter and presenter for Newshub.

He grew up in Blenheim, New Zealand and was schooled at Marlborough Boys' College and Christchurch Boys' High School. He then moved to Fairfield, Connecticut where he began his university studies whilst also on a full soccer scholarship. O'Keeffe graduated from Fairfield University with a Bachelor of Arts (B.A), Television New Media.

In June 2012 O'Keeffe received a late call-up to the All Whites as an injury replacement for Mark Paston in the 2012 OFC Nations Cup.
  
O'Keeffe was selected for the New Zealand football team, participating in the 2012 Summer Olympics.

In 2013 O'Keeffe joined USL Premier Development League team Ocean City Nor'easters.

In 2014, he returned to New Zealand to play for Team Wellington in the 2014/2015 ASB Premiership.

Since 2017, he has been a TV reporter and presenter for Newshub.

References

External links

NZ Football profile
Fairfield Stag's profile
2012 London Olympics profile
Olé Football Academy profile

1990 births
Living people
New Zealand association footballers
New Zealand expatriate association footballers
Olympic association footballers of New Zealand
Association footballers from Christchurch
Canterbury United players
Fairfield Stags men's soccer players
Ocean City Nor'easters players
Expatriate soccer players in the United States
USL League Two players
2012 OFC Nations Cup players
Footballers at the 2012 Summer Olympics
People educated at Marlborough Boys' College
People educated at Christchurch Boys' High School
Association football goalkeepers